A water power engine includes prime movers driven by water and which may be classified under three categories:
 Water pressure motors, having a piston and cylinder with inlet and outlet valves: their action is that analogous of a steam- or gas-engine with water as the working fluid – see water engine
 Water wheels
 Turbines, deriving their energy from high velocity jet of jets (the impulse machine), or from water supplied under pressure and passing through the vanes of a runner which is thereby caused to rotate (the reaction type)

Hydro power is generated when the natural force from the water's current moves a device (fan, propeller, wheel) that is pushed by the force of the water. Ordinary water weighs 8.36 lbs per gallon (1 kg per liter). The force make the turbine mechanism spin, creating electricity. As long as there is flow, it is possible to produce electricity. The advantage of electricity generated in this way is that it is a renewable resource.  A small-scale Micro Hydro Power can be a reliable and long lasting piece of technology. The disadvantage of the system is that technology has yet to be developed more than what it is today.

Stanley Myer 

As the prices for gasoline continued to soar a man of many inventions named Stanley Myer worked on a solution that would cut the cost of fueling our cars as well as help the planet. The war on the supply and demand of a necessity for vehicles would become a distant memory if Myer could make his invention work for all vehicles. Myer transformed a dune buggy's fuel system into a system that used water to fuel its engine, which replaced gasoline. The idea was to have cars altered to accommodate the water powered engines.  On June 24, 1992 Myer applied to have his work patented. He was a man of many inventions and patents such as his work on Process and apparatus for the production of fuel gas and the enhanced release of thermal energy from such gas, Method for the production of a fuel gas, Controlled process for the production of thermal energy from gases and apparatus useful therefore,  Electrical pulse generator, Gas electrical hydrogen generator, Start-up/shut-down for a hydrogen gas burner, Light-guide lens, Solar heating system Multi-stage solar storage system. After a long two years later on March 15, 1994, Myer patented his work. Hydrogen gas fuel and management system for an internal combustion engine using hydrogen gas fuel, patent number 5293857. This invention would use a 2:1 portion of hydrogen to oxygen and a regulated density of the hydrogen component of the mixture such that the burn rate of the mixture approximates that of a fossil fuel and a system for maintaining the foregoing gas fuel mixture and characteristics in an internal combustion engine. According to Myer, this transformed dune buggy could run a whopping 100 miles per gallon. The dune buggy was able to go so far on water due to a process called electrolysis. The investors and courts felt Myer and his inventions were fraudulent.

Two years later Myer was accused of fraud and had to pay back his investors. The idea was that he had not invented anything new or useful it was a simple use of electrolysis. The investors and courts felt Myer and his inventions were fraudulent. There was another idea that it is impossible to use water in cars due to heat the tolerability of it. 

Normal water electrolysis requires the passage of current measured in amps, Meyer's cell achieves the same effect in milliamps. Furthermore ordinary tap water requires the addition of an electrolyte such as sulphuric acid to aid current conduction; Meyer's cell functions at greatest efficiency with pure water.

Pros of water-power engines and hydro power 
Water-powered engines and hydro power can have many advantages in a society that relies mostly on non-renewable resources such as oil and coal. Water covers an estimated 71 percent of the Earth's surface. In conjunction with normal weather patterns such as evaporation and precipitation, water is a natural renewable resource that is in abundance on Earth.

Hydroelectric power has been a popular method of energy dating back to the late 19th century. The main advantage of using hydropower is that it is a clean form of energy, otherwise known as "green" energy. Since the process of using waterpower does not require burning fossil fuels, it is more environmentally friendly. Fewer Greenhouse gasses are emitted into the atmosphere contributing to climate change, lower levels of smog in large cities, and a lesser chance of acid rain taking place.

In the current economy, fossil fuels account for most competitive markets between big businesses. This leads to a constant fluctuation in economic prices being considerably high or low depending on supply and demand. Unlike fossil fuels which are non-renewable, rivers, lakes, and ocean water are an infinite resource. Dams are a product of the water-power engine and provide consistent energy to nearby populated areas. Murray 1 and 2 Hydro Electric Power Stations and the Tumut 3 Hydroelectric Power Station in Australia is responsible for generating between 550 megawatts and 1,800 megawatts of electricity. The water powered turbines used in these dams need little maintenance, are easily upgradable with modern technology, and have a lifespan of 50–100 years.

Clean energy created by hydro power plants attracts positive results in otherwise remote areas. It enhances commerce and gives rise to more industry. The overall education improves in these areas as well as healthcare. Dams that run on hydro powered engines create lakes that attract tourists and boosts the economy in those areas. Such as the Hoover Dam which attracts 7 million tourists every year. The advantages of using hydro power and controlling water flow also has irrigation benefits. In areas that have less rainfall, such as Arizona and Nevada, the ability to control the waterpower engine's water consumption saves water during dry seasons making the region less reliant on natural rainfall.

Cons of water-power engines and hydro power 
Although beneficial in the long run, water powered engines require materials that require a high financial price. Hydro powered dams require less maintenance once fully constructed, however the time it takes to earn its revenue back may take almost its whole lifespan.

Some water powered engines and the plants associated with them can emit large amounts of methane and carbon dioxide into the atmosphere. This is mainly due to the surrounding reservoirs that have stagnant water where over long periods of time plants and other biological material decomposes and produces environmentally harmful pollutants into the air.

Conspiracy theories

Stanley Meyer death 
The idea of a water powered car has been around since Stanley Meyer made it popular in the late 20th century. However, he was met with pushback from an Ohio court claiming that such an automobile could not possibly work. Meyer abruptly died in 1998 while eating at a restaurant. According to his brother, Meyer ran out of the restaurant screaming "They’ve poisoned me" before succumbing to his death. Due to this account, many believe that Meyer was indeed poisoned by those trying to dismantle the idea of clean energy, especially in a time of a booming auto industry. This was never proven to be true as an autopsy revealed that Meyer died from a cerebral aneurysm and not poison.

Conspiracy theorists believe that there is a global suppression surrounding the idea of creating a successful water fuel cell or fully water powered engine. This stems from the idea that large oil companies that control most of the revenue related to gas and fossil fuels do not want water fueled technology to overpower current gas and electric reliant vehicles. This would not only create a cheaper, cleaner, and more efficient engine but also would eventually make oil companies obsolete.

Genepax 
One such event that raised eyebrows was the company Genepax and their water powered car. Primarily based in Japan, it was unveiled in 2008 that Genepax had a working concept car that ran solely on air and water. It did this by using a special water energy system and a membrane electrode assembly (MES). These two technologies combined was able to break down hydrogen and oxygen through the processes of a chemical reaction. It was a design that made the future of water powered technology attainable and not too far off from becoming the future of clean energy.

That is until the mid 2000s that Genepax suddenly shut its doors for good without notice. For a company that made many appearances to the public showcasing the future of automobiles, many find it strange that it ended so suddenly, which correlates with the sudden death of the inventor himself Stanley Meyer. According to those who follow such theories, no water powered engine has successfully been invented to the point of getting a patent to produce and distribute to auto manufacturers. The uncertainty behind events such as these are what fuels conspiracy theorists to continue to support the suppression of clean energy technology by unknown entities.

Recent inventions 
Currently in Israel, MayMaan Research, LLC, has developed a powerful piston engine that runs on a combination of water and ethanol (or another alcohol) and does not require the use of diesel or regular gasoline. The water powered piston engine eliminates both nitrogen and sulfur oxides that create harmful air quality. They estimate that it is 60 percent more efficient than gasoline and can save on 50 percent of fuel costs. They plan to not only focus on automobiles but overall transportation such as ships, trains, and large trucks. The mission that MayMaan Research and its founders are trying to accomplish is to eliminate the dependency on fossil fuels worldwide and to create a greener environment for all.

Ten inventions of hydro power

 Helicoid penstocks – Similar to a rifle barrel, etched spiral grooves on the inside, rushed water flows through the helicoid penstock and starts to spin then the pipes flows the water directly on an electric turbine which then improves the turbines performance.

 Fish ladders – The Thompson Falls hydroelectric plant in Montana houses the most technologically advanced fish ladder in the United States of America.

 Hydrosphere – A hydroelectric generator which uses the intense pressure differentials in the deeper ends of lakes and or oceans. The hydrosphere's inventor Rick Dickson states it can generate up to 500 megawatts of continuous renewable energy.

 Air–water gravity generator – Another invention from Rick Dickson, believed to be the hydro plant of the future. Pressured water is let into the Air – Water- Gravity generator which generates power by entering a vacuum chamber which then forces a piston to climb a stator. Electricity is generated at that point.

 Wave power – Less known about waves, they are considered to produce hydrokinetic energy as kinetic energy is in the movement of the waves crashing against the shores and rocks.  Scientists believe if they could extract 15 percent of energy it could generate as much electricity as all the hydroelectric dams in the nation.

 Tidal power – Again the powers of the water are at work here. It is noted that the water can carry immense power and pressure therefore can be used in several ways that benefit us and in this case we can use it to generate electricity. Resembling a lawn mower better known as a under sea windmill the turbines rotate when tides rush in and out which generates power and can give power up to 30 homes.

 River power – This happens to be an idea that can produce energy but also preserves wildlife as it does not require the alterations and constructions like dams and fish ladders. It would consist of modules- turbines, stabilizer, mooring system, and energy conversion systems. Again, water flows through the turbines which then allows the river's energy to be collected and drives a generator. The river's energy can generate 50 kilowatts with a water speed of 4 knots. With this system in place it does not disrupt the natural livelihood of fish and river traffic.

 Vortex power – VIVACE – Vortex Induced Vibration for Aquatic Clean Energy. This system is based on fish movement and their use of pushing their bodies off vortices to move forward. This invention can capture energy on slow moving rivers.

 Pipe power – A newer invention to capture energy through water, this system uses municipal pipes. Created by Leviathan. Benkatina turbine works off water that flows through enclosed pipes, sewer pipes, canals, and pipes used to remove wastewater from factories.

 Making a splash – Fzulton Innovation has created Lilliputian hydroelectric technologies . This system allows one to power their home appliances with the use of the water from their own faucets. It is noted it can also create emergency lighting and can charge batteries. This seems to be a great invention for families who live in areas with a high impact from weather and having their power cut off consistently.

Many inventions involve water. The problem is finding inventions that can be useful to all people and help curve poverty as well as curve the negative impacts inventions have on our natural world and wild life.

See also

Water engine
Water-fuelled car
Water-returning engine
Water turbine
Working fluid
Rankine cycle
Hydroelectricity

References

Engines
Hydraulics
Hydraulic engineering
Sustainable technologies